Crystal Allen (born 13 August 1972) is an American film and television actress.

Biography
Allen is from Alberta, Canada. She is an actress who has starred and appeared in guest star roles, including episodes of such TV series as Sex and the City, Ed, The Sopranos, Boston Legal, Star Trek: Enterprise, JAG, Desperate Housewives and others. She has also appeared in television commercials, including ads for Tic Tac Mints, Nissan and Almay.

She starred in the Hallmark Channel original movie, Falling in Love with the Girl Next Door. In 2020 she was one of the single mothers in Beware of Mom.

Filmography

Film

Television

References

External links

1972 births
Living people
20th-century American actresses
21st-century American actresses
American television actresses
American film actresses
Actresses from Orange County, California